Annick Obonsawin (born October 12, 1983) is a First Nations Abenaki Canadian actress.

Biography

Obonsawin has played roles in many children's shows such as Inez in Cyberchase and Skunk in Franklin. She also played Slappy the Dummy in Goosebumps, and Sierra Obenauer in Total Drama. She voiced Jamie, Johnny and Jimmy's sister, in the 2014 animated film The Nut Job; Belinda in the Disney Junior/TVOKids animated TV series Ella the Elephant; and Startail in Starlink: Battle for Atlas. She also voices Helda from George Shrinks.

Family
Obonsawin lives with her mother, father and sister in Unionville, Ontario. A First Nations woman, she is of Abenaki heritage.

Filmography

Film

Television

References

External links
 
 

1983 births
Living people
Abenaki people
Actresses from Toronto
Canadian film actresses
Canadian television actresses
Canadian voice actresses
First Nations actresses
20th-century Canadian actresses
21st-century Canadian actresses
20th-century First Nations people
21st-century First Nations people